William F. Klusman  (March 24, 1865 – June 24, 1907) was a 19th-century Major League Baseball second baseman. He played  with the Boston Beaneaters of the National League in 1888  and the St. Louis Browns  of the American Association in 1890. He was playing in the minor leagues as late as 1898.

External links
Baseball-Reference page

1865 births
1907 deaths
19th-century baseball players
Major League Baseball second basemen
Boston Beaneaters players
St. Louis Browns (AA) players
Leadville Blues players
Mobile Swamp Angels players
New Orleans Pelicans (baseball) players
Manchester Maroons players
Quincy Black Birds players
Denver Grizzlies (baseball) players
Denver Mountaineers players
Des Moines Prohibitionists players
Milwaukee Brewers (minor league) players
Milwaukee Creams players
Birmingham Grays players
Savannah Electrics players
Savannah Rabbits players
Kansas City Cowboys (minor league) players
Kansas City Blues (baseball) players
St. Joseph Saints players
Norfolk Jewels players
Baseball players from Ohio